RU-27, dubbed Scarlet Knight after the Rutgers Scarlet Knights athletic teams, is an experimental American autonomous underwater vehicle – a modified Slocum Autonomous Underwater Gliding Vehicle – operated by Rutgers University oceanographers. In December 2009, Scarlet Knight was the first robot to cross the Atlantic Ocean underwater, which took it 221 days.

References

External links
 Project website
 Trailer for upcoming documentary about RU-27
 Scarlet Knight Now Displayed at Smithsonian After Historic Trans-Atlantic Crossing

Underwater gliders